Kogure is a Japanese surname. Notable people with the surname include:

, Japanese footballer
Ema Kogure (born 1976), Japanese voice actress 
Fumiya Kogure (born 1989), Japanese football player
Kenichiro Kogure (born 1979), Japanese futsal player 
Michiyo Kogure (1918–1990), Japanese film actress
Shigeo Kogure (1935-2009), Japanese Olympic weightlifter
Takashi Kogure (born 1980), Japanese racing driver
Tamatsu Kogure (born 1930), Japanese Olympic rower
Demon Kogure, Japanese singer

See also 
7430 Kogure, a minor planet

Japanese-language surnames